Robinson in Roslagen (Swedish: Robinson i Roslagen) is a 1948 Swedish comedy film directed by Schamyl Bauman and starring Adolf Jahr,  Ludde Gentzel and Gull Natorp. It was shot at the Centrumateljéerna Studios in Stockholm and on location at Grisslehamn. The film's sets were designed by the art director Arthur Spjuth.

Cast
 Adolf Jahr as 	Alfred
 Ludde Gentzel as 	Mandus
 Gull Natorp as 	Katrina
 Sigbrit Molin as 	Rosa
 Olof Bergström as 	Gunnar
 Carl Hagman as 	Tegel
 Margit Andelius as 	Esmeralda's sister 
 Albin Erlandzon as 	Fisherman 
 Claes Esphagen as Constable's deputy 
 Siegfried Fischer as Norman 
 Åke Fridell as 	Constable 
 Mona Geijer-Falkner as 	Fishing woman 
 Viktor Haak as Fisherman at pier 
 Nils Hallberg as 	Jonne 
 Gottfrid Holde as 	Customs officer 
 Siv Larsson as 	Miss Larsson 
 Birger Lensander as Customs officer 
 Wilma Malmlöf as 	Esmeralda 
 Georg Skarstedt as Holmberg
 Carl Ström as Sheriff
 Alf Östlund as Customs officer

References

Bibliography 
 Per Olov Qvist & Peter von Bagh. Guide to the Cinema of Sweden and Finland. Greenwood Publishing Group, 2000.

External links 
 

1948 films
1948 comedy films
Swedish comedy films
1940s Swedish-language films
Films directed by Schamyl Bauman
1940s Swedish films